Kevin Bennett (born 9 September 1981) is a South African cricketer. He played in 65 first-class, 43 List A, and four Twenty20 matches for Border from 2005 to 2016. His twin brother, Bevan, also played first-class cricket.

See also
 List of Border representative cricketers

References

External links
 

1981 births
Living people
South African cricketers
Border cricketers
Cricketers from East London, Eastern Cape